Petrus Arnoldus Crous (born July 2, 1955) is a South African former professional boxer who competed from 1977 to 1987.

Professional career
Crous turned pro in 1977. He won the WBA cruiserweight title with a unanimous decision win over Ossie Ocasio in 1984, though he was paid less than $10,000. He defended the belt once, on March 30, 1985, at the Sun City Super Bowl in Sun City, South Africa, against American challenger Randy Stephens, recuperating from a third round knockdown to knock Stephens out in that same third round. Crous became the first South African to retain a world boxing title in 35 years. He lost the title to Dwight Muhammad Qawi via TKO the following year; he was knocked down twice in the 11th round. He retired in 1987.

References

External links
 

1955 births
Living people
South African male boxers
Cruiserweight boxers
World cruiserweight boxing champions
World Boxing Association champions
Boxers from Johannesburg